The Red Bull Cliff Diving World Series, established in 2009 and created by Red Bull, is an annual international series of cliff diving events in which a limited number of competitors determine the Cliff Diving World Series winner.

Divers jump from a platform at a height ranging from 26 to 28 m (85–92 ft). Competitions are held in a limited number of venues around the globe.

Tour ranking 
Every athlete scores a number of points in every competition as distributed here:

Points system from 2012 
In 2012 the Series introduced a new point system that was continued to be used also during the 2013 season.

Cliff Diving World Series champion is the athlete who scored the highest cumulated number of points in all competitions during the season.

The top 6 divers in the overall ranking at the end of the season will pre-qualify automatically for the next season.

Results by year

Men

Women

Tour events 

1 Divers jumped at 4 different sites: Wang Long Bay, (Phi Phi Don), Maya Bay, (Phi Phi Lee), Viking Cave, Lading Bay
2 No qualification stop was held in 2014; up to four wildcards joined 10 permanent divers at each stop.
3 Series cancelled due to the COVID-19 pandemic.

Competition rules 
 Men perform 4 dives from a height ranging from 26–28m. There are a total of nine groups (front, back, reverse, inward, front twists, back twists, reverse twists, inward twists and all armstand dives).
 The two required dives must be performed from different take-off positions. There are 5 take-off positions (front, back, reverse, inward and armstand). The degree of difficulty for each required dive is 3.6. To clarify: front double half twist and front double 1½ twist are different groups, but the same take-off position. If a dive has less degree of difficulty, it will still be 3.6.
 The two optional dives must be from different groups from the 9 groups mentioned above. In addition, the optional dives must be done in alternating order every competition.
 A list of dives for each diver shall consist of two required dives of a fixed degree of difficulty for every athlete (3.6), and two optional dives assigned a degree of difficulty computed from the 2010 HDA table.
 The first required dive will be done after a short warm-up on the second training day. This is already part of the competition and will count 100 percent towards the total score. After this first round of dives, training can resume. The next day will have a short warm-up period followed by 2 dives (one required, one optional dive) in head-to-head format.
 The final dive will be done by the top 8 divers (winners head-to-head plus one lucky loser) in reverse order according to their cumulative score from the first 3 dives.
 Balks will receive a 2-point deduction from each judge for the first balk. Another 2-point deduction for the second balk and be considered a failed dive on the third balk. A balk is considered an interruption in movement after the diver does his press immediately before the dive. For armstand dives it is the point when both feet leave the platform (use FINA definitions).
 Running take-offs on forward dive groups (including twists) are allowed, given there is enough space for the approach.
 If the diver enters the water with his hands up on a feet-first entry, he can only get a maximum score of 5 points from each judge. The 5 points would mean a perfect execution of the entire dive with the exception of the arms. If arms are at or below shoulder height but not in alignment with the body (straight arms either in front or on the side of the body), judges can deduct between ½ to 2 points at their discretion according to the degree of the mistake.
 A break in position at or just before entry can have a deduction of ½ to 2 points at the judges' discretion. An intermediate break of position can receive no more than 4.5 points from each judge. If a dive is done in a completely different position than announced: for example back triple tuck instead of back triple pike, the dive can only receive a maximum of 2 points.
 All dives submitted in a list must consist of at least 180 degrees of rotation around a horizontal axis.

Scoring 
 Five judges score each dive based on a scale of 0 to 10 in half-point increments.
 Each judge scores the dives without assistance.
 The highest and the lowest judges’ scores will be discarded. The remaining three scores are added and multiplied by the degree of difficulty for that dive.
 This will produce the total score for each dive. The total score of all dives performed are added together to produce the overall total for the competition for each diver.
 Balks will constitute a deduction from each judge's score as directed by the Head Judge. The dive will be scored as usual and the announcer will deduct two points from each judge's score.

See also 

2014 FINA High Diving World Cup
La Quebrada Cliff Divers
List of World Aquatics Championships medalists in high diving
Red Bull Cliff Diving World Series – annual international series of cliff diving events that was established in 2009
Tombstoning

References

External links 
 Red Bull Cliff Diving – Official website

 
High diving competitions
Red Bull sports events
Sports competition series
Recurring sporting events established in 2009